Social documentary photography or concerned photography is the recording of what the world looks like, with a social and/or environmental focus. It is a form of documentary photography, with the aim to draw the public's attention to ongoing social issues. It may also refer to a socially critical genre of photography dedicated to showing the life of underprivileged or disadvantaged people.

Origin of social documentary photography

Social documentary photography has its roots in the 19th Century work of Henry Mayhew, Jacob Riis, and Lewis Hine, but began to take further form through the photographic practice of the Farm Security Administration (FSA) in the USA. The FSA hired photographers and writers to report and document the plight of poor farmers. Under Roy Stryker, the Information Division of the FSA adopted a goal of "introducing America to Americans." Many noted Depression-era photographers were fostered by the FSA project, including Walker Evans, Dorothea Lange, and Gordon Parks. The photographers documented the situation of poor farmers, whose economic existence was threatened, and created a new style with photographic documentation of social problems.

FSA made 250,000 images of rural poverty, but only about half survive. These are now housed in the Prints and Photographs Division of the Library of Congress and online. From these some 77,000 different finished photographic prints were originally made for the press, plus 644 color images from 1,600 color negatives.

Characteristics of social documentary photography
Social documentary photography or concerned photography may often be devoted to 'social groups' with socio-economic and cultural similarities, showing living or working conditions perceived as shameful, discriminatory, unjust or harmful. Examples include child labor, child neglect, homelessness, poverty among segments of society, impoverished children and the elderly, and hazardous working conditions. The poor, the social outcasts, or lower classes are portrayed in compassionate observation. The documentary power of the images is associated with the desire for political and social change.

History
As early as in the 19th century the living conditions for the lower classes were the subject of photography. Henry Mayhew photographed the book London Labour and the London Poor, a representation of the depiction of London's working class. The book was illustrated by woodcuts, from photographs by Beard. Thomas Annan published "Photographs of the Old Closes and Streets of Glasgow, 1868-77", a documentation of the slum areas in Glasgow. Yet another example is the book published by Smith and Thompson in 1877 "Street Life in London", which also documented social life. England was the birthplace of social documentary photography, given the advanced stage of industrialization, and its impact on society.

In the United States two photographers got involved at the end of the 19th century in favor of people on the margins of society, Jacob Riis and Lewis Hine. For them the camera was an instrument of accusation against social injustice. In 1890 Riis documented the living conditions of the unemployed and homeless in New York ("How the Other Half Lives"). He was also interested in the fate of immigrants, many of whom lived in extreme poverty in the New York slums. Riis clearly takes sides for the people he photographed and appeals to the social conscience of society. In 1908 the National Child Labor Committee hired Hine, a sociology professor who advocated photography as an educational medium, to document child labor in American industry. In the early 20th century Hine would publish thousands of photographs designed to pull at the nation's heartstrings. Child Labor was widespread in the U.S. in the early 20th century. Hine equally drew attention to the situation of immigrants. The work of Riis and Hine had political influence. Riis' commitment to the people in the Mulberry Bend neighborhood led to its demolition. The building of schools and educational programs can also be attributed to Riis. Hine's work culminated in a law against child labor, the Keating-Owen Act of 1916, which was repealed shortly after the entry of the U.S. into the First World War.

An English pioneer of socially committed photography is Bill Brandt. Brandt is particularly renowned for his experimental studies of the nude. He moved to England in 1931 and worked for several magazines, for which he published coverages on people affected by the Great Depression. In 1936 he published the illustrated book "The English at Home", in which he portrayed the English class system. He traveled to the Midlands and to northern England where he photographed the effects of the Great Depression.

After 1945 the dedicated, collectively organized social documentary photography no longer was able to gain ground, except in England, where the tradition lingered on a bit longer. The vigorous anti-communism of the McCarthy era had anathematized the engaged, liberal social documentary photography with the verdict of evil. Great documentary photographers of the postwar era, such as W. Eugene Smith, Diane Arbus, Robert Frank, William Klein or Mary Ellen Mark were either lone fighters or were forced to work as story-suppliers for the large illustrated magazines (especially Life). Squeezed into the economic restraints of circulation increases, political outsider positions found little room. Nevertheless, photographers devoted themselves to social issues in the second half of the 20th century. Thus Eugene Smith documented in the late 1960s the fate of the inhabitants of the Japanese fishing village of Minamata who had fallen ill as a result of mercury poisoning. In the 1960s and 70s, Lee Friedlander evolved an influential and often imitated visual language of urban social landscape, with many of his photographs including fragments of store-front reflections, structures framed by fences, posters and street signs, and seeking to understand his era by examining society's cultural furniture, while Garry Winogrand made photographs in order "to see what the world looks like in photographs."

British photojournalist Don McCullin specialised in examining the underside of society, and his photographs have depicted the unemployed, downtrodden and the impoverished. He is also recognised for his war photography and images of urban strife.

John Ranard (1952-2008) began his social documentary photography in his depictions of the brutal and ironic world of boxing. Portions of his boxing portfolio, The Brutal Aesthetic, were published in the book On Boxing (Doubleday, 1987) with the text written by Joyce Carol Oates. Ranard went on to photograph squatters and the homeless in New York City, and spent lengthy periods in Russia photographing perestroika and the poignant problem of HIV/AIDS in Russia. He gained access to Russian prisons and photographed the grim life of Russian prisoners. A good many of his Russian photographs appeared in Forty Pounds of Salt (Fly by Night Press, 1995), Full Life and The Fire Within (the last two published by Medecins Sans Frontieres (Holland) & AIDS Foundation East-West, 2001). Ranard was closely connected with Louisville, Kentucky throughout his career. In his portfolio On Every Corner he photographed the inside world of the black communities' store-front churches. The churches were faced with the problem of violence by black teenagers.

A social documentary photographer of the present is Brazilian photographer Sebastião Salgado, who has documented the industrial age (Workers: An Archaeology of the Industrial Age, 1993). Another central theme of his work is the global phenomenon of migration (The Children: Refugees and Migrant (2000) and Migrations (2000)). In both documentaries he demonstrated the plight of refugees in many countries around the world.

The documentary photography of Martin Parr contrasts starkly with that of Salgado, at times being humorous.

The aims of social documentation continue today in Puerto Rican photographer Manuel Rivera-Ortiz's photographs of lives in poverty. Affected by his own experience of growing up poor in rural Puerto Rico, Rivera-Ortiz refers to his work as a celebration of life, in poverty.

Acceptance by the art world
Since the late 1970s, social documentary photography has increasingly been accorded a place in art galleries alongside fine art photography. Luc Delahaye, Manuel Rivera-Ortiz, John Ranard, and the members of VII Photo Agency are among many who have regularly exhibited in galleries and museums.

Border areas and related genres
Some photographers address social issues without dedicated advocacy for the victims of social inequality and grievance, such as Diane Arbus or Tina Barney. While Arbus created haunting images of deviant and marginal people (dwarfs, giants, transgender people, nudists, circus performers) or of people whose normality seems ugly or surreal, Barney documented the life of the white upper class in New England.
Social documentary in the literal sense are multifaceted documentations from workaday life in certain cities, landscapes and cultures. The examples are equally varied as the opportunities. Roman Vishniac may be mentioned as a characteristic representative, who documented Jewish life in Eastern Europe prior to the Holocaust (Verschwundene Welt, A Vanished World)|.
Another genre close to the procedures and results of social documentary photography can be found in the ethnographic photography that often documents people in precarious situations, however intending to document disappearing traditions, clothing or living conditions.

Social Realism is an artistic movement, expressed in the visual and other realist arts, which depicts working class activities as heroic. Many artists who subscribed to Social Realism were painters with socialist political views. The movement therefore has some commonalities with the Socialist Realism used in certain Communist nations.

Footnotes

Further reading
London Labour and the London Poor; selections made and introduced by Victor Neuburg, Penguin Classics 1985, 
 Geoffrey Dunn, "Untitled Depression Documentary", 1980
Robert J. Doherty, Social-Documentary Photography in the US, Hardcover, Amphoto,  (0-8174-0316-7)
The New Documentary Tradition in Photography (Lisa Hostetler, The Metropolitan Museum of Art)

 
Photography by genre
Photography
Photojournalism